Jennifer or Jenny Bowen may refer to:

People
Jenny Bowen (filmmaker), American screenwriter, director, and founder of OneSky
Jennifer Bowen, featured on true crime series Snapped
Jennifer Bowen, Miss America's Outstanding Teen state pageants

Fictional characters
Jenny Bowen, character in Best Friends Together
Jenny Bowen, character, love interest of Steve Smith (American Dad!)